The Réseau des Émetteurs Français  (REF) (in English, literally "Network of French Radio Transmitters") is a national non-profit organization for amateur radio enthusiasts in France.  Key membership benefits of the organization include QSL bureau services, a monthly membership magazine called Radio REF, and the promotion and sponsorship of radio contests and operating awards.  REF promotes amateur radio by organizing classes and technical support to help enthusiasts earn their amateur radio license.  The REF-Union also represents the interests of French amateur radio operators and shortwave listeners before French and international telecommunications regulatory authorities.  REF is the national member society representing France in the International Amateur Radio Union.

See also 
International Amateur Radio Union

References 

France
Clubs and societies in France
Organizations established in 1925
1925 establishments in France
Radio in France
Organizations based in Tours, France